The Vampire is a surviving 1915 American silent drama film directed by Alice Guy and starring Olga Petrova. It was distributed through Metro Pictures. This is one of Petrova and Guy's few surviving silent films.

Cast
Olga Petrova as Jeanne Lefarge
Vernon Steele as Robert Sterling
William A. Morse as John Glenning
Wallace Scott as Louis Katz
Lawrence Grattan as Richard Sterling
Albert Howson as Francis Murray
Mary G. Martin

Preservation status
The film is preserved in the collection Library of Congress.

References

External links

 Olga Petrova in The Vampire at kinotv.com

1915 films
American silent feature films
Films directed by Alice Guy-Blaché
American black-and-white films
Silent American drama films
1915 drama films
Metro Pictures films
1910s American films